ʻAbasa ("He Frowned") is the 80th chapter (sura) of the Qur'an, with 42 verses (ayat). It is a Meccan sura. The Surah is so designated after the word `abasa with which it opens.

Summary
1-11 Muhammad rebuked for frowning on a poor blind Muslim
12-15 The Quran written in honourable, exalted, and pure volumes
16-23 Man cursed for turning aside from his Creator
24-32 It is God who provides man with food
33-37 On the judgment-day men will desert their nearest relatives and friends
38-42 The bright and sad faces of the resurrection-day

Period of revelation

Sunni view 
According to traditionalists of the Sunni origin, at one time Mohammad was earnestly engaged in persuading the chiefs of Makkah to accept Islam. A blind man approached him to seek explanation of some point concerning Islam. Muhammad disliked his interruption and ignored him. Thereupon God sent down this Surah. From this historical incident the period of the revelation of this Surah can be precisely determined.

In the first place, it was claimed  by Ibn Hajar (d.1449) and Ibn Kathir that the blind man, Ibn Umm Maktūm, was one of the earliest converts to Islam. 

Secondly, some of the traditions of the Hadith which relate this incident show that he had already accepted Islam, and some others show that he was inclined to accept it and had approached Muhammad in search of the truth. Aishah states that coming to Muhammad he had said: "O Messenger of God, guide me to the straight path." (Tirmidhi (d.892), Hakim (d.871), Ibn Hibban, Al-Tabari, Abu Ya'la). According to Abdullah bin Abbas, he had asked the meaning of a verse of the Qur'an and said to Muhammad: "O Messenger of God, teach me the knowledge that God has taught you" (Al-Tabari, Ibn Abu Hatim). These statements show that he had acknowledged Muhammad. Contrary to this, Ibn Zaid has interpreted the words "la'allahu yazzakka" of verse 3 to mean: , "that perhaps he might become Muslim." (Al-Tabari) And God's own words: "What would make you know that he might reform, or heed the admonition, and admonishing might profit him?" and "The one who comes to you running, of his own will, and fears, from him you turn away", point out that by that time he had developed in himself a deep desire to learn the truth: he had come to Muhammad with the belief that he was the only source of guidance, and his desire would be satisfied only through him; his apparent state also reflected that if he was given instruction, he would benefit by it.

Thirdly, the names of the people who were sitting in Muhammad's assembly at that time, have been given in different traditions. In this list we find the names of Utba ibn Rabi'ah, Shaibah, Abu Jahl, Umayyah ibn Khalaf, Ubay ibn Khalaf, who were the bitterest enemies of Islam. This shows that the incident took place in the period when these chiefs were still on meeting terms with the Muhammad and their antagonism to Islam had not yet grown so strong as to have stopped their paying visits to him and having dialogues with him off and on. All these arguments indicate that this is one of the very earliest Surahs to be revealed at Makkah.

Shia perspective 
The Shia interpretations are unanimous on the view that the person that frowned away was not Muhammad, but an elite from Banu Umayya. According to them, these verses were descended about the man from Banu Umayya who was sitting with Muhammad. At the same time, Abdullah bin Umm Maktum entered, when the rich man saw the poverty stricken Abdullah he drew himself aside, not to get his dress dirty and contracted his facial expressions which got uneasy. In those verses God stated his acts and criticized and condemned them.

The tenses of grammar used 
The word used was Abasa, which refers to 'He'. The Quran does not directly impose the frowning on Muhammad, instead it says "He frowned away", making it widely open for interpretation.

References

External links
Q80:1, 50+ translations, islamawakened.com

Chapters in the Quran
Afterlife
Biographies of Muhammad
Life of Muhammad